The 2007 UNCAF U-16 Tournament was the 2nd UNCAF U-16 Tournament, a biennial international football tournament contested by men's under-16 national teams.  Organized by UNCAF, the tournament took place in Belize between 19 and 23 September 2007.

The matches were played at MCC Grounds.  Five Central American teams took part of the tournament, playing each other in a round-robin format.  Honduras and Nicaragua did not send a team.  El Salvador won the tournament.

Venue

Final standings

Results

References

External links
UNCAF Official Website

2007
2007 in youth association football
2007–08 in Belizean football
2007